Blakk Rasta (born Abubakar Ahmed (born 2 September 1974) is a Ghanaian reggae / Kuchoko artiste, dub poet and a radio presenter of Zylofon FM. He is best known for the song "Barack Obama" sung in honor of the 44th U.S President. He was honored at a special dinner with President Obama on 11 July 2010.

Musical style 
Blakk Rasta does "Kuchoko" which is predominantly reggae music fused with African rhythms and energies pouring out conscious lyrics about love, equal rights and justice, blackness, rasta and spiritual love.

Blakk Rasta's current "Kuchoko" sound innovation came about after a long period of research into a new sound, which will ride on reggae music and establish a sound which will cut across indigenous African sights, sounds and spirituality and be accepted worldwide in these fast changing times of musical tastes and preferences.

Indigenous African instruments such as the xylophone, talking drum (dondo), kette, flute, kologo, kora fused with animal and jungle sounds, and sounds from local markets.

Career 
Abubakar Ahmed, aka Blakk Rasta who was born on September 2, 1974, in Tamale to devout Ahmadi-Moslem parents. Growing in the slums of Moshie-Zongo and Aboabo. Blakk Rasta is also a reggae DJ on radio. He was adjudged the best Reggae DJ in Ghana when he was on Happy 98.9 FM. The controversial former host of the midmorning program ‘Taxi Driver’ on Hitz 103.9 FM, revealed via his Twitter account on July 6, 2015  that he has said his goodbyes to the Multimedia-owned Kokomlemle based radio station in Accra. Blakk Rasta then joined Zylofon FM in 2017 to continue 'Taxi Driver'. After four years of working at Zylofon FM, Blakk Rasta Live on air (Wednesday 29 December 2021) announced that he will be leaving the East-legon based radio on Friday 31 December 2021. According to Blakk Rasta, his decision not to abandon the station in spite of financial challenges was purely out of loyalty to his boss, NAM1, who had tasked him to consider the station as his own baby.

After leaving Zylofon FM, Blakk Rasta now created a channel on YouTube called 'Blakk Media Empire', to still continue his show 'The Black Pot'.

Inspiration 
He was inspired by Jamaican dub poet; Mutabaruka, DYCR and Linton Kwesi Johnson.

Honors and awards 
 In June 2011, Blakk Rasta was voted and confirmed as the 'Radio Reggae Show Host of the Year' by the Ghana Radio And TV Awards. He has won other awards such as the BASS Awards in 2013, with a reggae song with Jah Amber titled "Our Africa".

Discography

Selected singles 
 "Dede"
 "Barack Obama"
 "Gaddafi"
 "Mallam Tonga"
 "Gaddafi, My Hero"
 "52 Ambulances" (Knii Lante ft. Blakk Rasta, 2018)
 "Naked Wire" (2008)
 "Caro Caro (Corona Virus Lamentation)"
Mpumalanga
 "Camaroon"
 "Piano Logoligi"
 "Bloody Museveni"
Raggamuffin com
 "Mr President" (2021)
 "Kwame Nkrumah"

Albums 
 2000: The Rasta Shrine
 2002: More Fyah
 2004: Ganja Minister
 2006: Natty Bongo
 2008: Naked Wire
 2010: Voice of the African Rebel
 2011: Born Dread
 2014: Ancestral Moonsplash
 2016: Kuchoko Revolution
 2019: Timbuktu By Road

References

External links 
 iTunes

Living people
1974 births
Ghanaian Rastafarians
Ghanaian musicians
People from Tamale, Ghana
T.I. Ahmadiyya Senior High School (Kumasi) alumni